This is a list in alphabetical order of cricketers who have played for Glamorgan County Cricket Club in top-class matches since 1921 when the club joined the County Championship and the team was elevated to official first-class status. Glamorgan has been classified as a List A team since the beginning of limited overs cricket in 1963; and as a first-class Twenty20 team since the inauguration of the Twenty20 Cup in 2003.

The details are the player's usual name followed by the years in which he was active as a Glamorgan player and then his name is given as it usually appears on match scorecards. Note that many players represented other top-class teams besides Glamorgan and that some played for the club in minor counties cricket before 1921. Current players are shown as active to the latest season in which they played for the club. The list excludes Second XI and other players who did not play for the club's first team; and players whose first team appearances were in minor matches only. The list has been updated to the end of the 2021 cricket season using the data published in Playfair Cricket Annual, 2022 edition.

A
 Tom Abel (1922–1925) : T. E. Abel
 Jim Allenby (2009–2014) : J. Allenby
 Tony Allin (1976) : A. W. Allin
 Reg Anderson (1946) : R. M. B. Anderson
 Hamish Anthony (1990–1995) : H. A. G. Anthony
 Greg Armstrong (1974–1976) : G. D. Armstrong
 Trevor Arnott (1921–1930) : T. Arnott
 Chris Ashling (2009–2011) : C. P. Ashling

B
 Andrew Balbirnie (2020–2021) A. Balbirnie
 Jack Bancroft (1922) : J. Bancroft
 Steve Barwick (1981–1996) : S. R. Barwick
 Simon Base (1986–1987) : S. J. Base
 Steve Bastien (1988–1994) : S. Bastien
 William Bates (1921–1931) : W. E. Bates
 Herbie Baxter (1921) : H. W. Baxter
 John Bell (1924–1931) : J. T. Bell
 Jamie Bishop (1992) : J. Bishop
 David Blackmore (1934) : D. Blackmore
 Ronnie Boon (1931–1932) : R. W. Boon
 Elvyn Bowen (1928–1933) : E. Bowen
 Will Bragg (2006–2017) : W. D. Bragg
 Pat Brain (1921–1928) : J. H. P. Brain
 Michael Brain (1930) : M. B. Brain
 Kraigg Brathwaite (2019) : K. C. Brathwaite
 Tom Brierley (1931–1939) : T. L. Brierley
 Connor Brown (2017–2019) : C. R. Brown
 David Brown (2010–2011) : D. O. Brown
 Kieran Bull (2014–2020) : K. A. Bull
 Tolly Burnett (1958) : A. C. Burnett
 Joe Burns (2018) : J. A. Burns
 Alan Butcher (1987–1992) : A. R. Butcher
 Gary Butcher (1994–1998) : G. P. Butcher
 Eddie Byrom (2021) : E. J. Byrom

C
 Mike Cann (1986–1991) : M. J. Cann
 Lukas Carey (2016–2021) : L. J. Carey
 Ernie Carless (1934–1946) : E. F. Carless
 Kiran Carlson (2016–2021) : K. S. Carlson
 Harry Carr (1934) : H. L. Carr
 Andy Carter (2015) : A. Carter
 Tom Cartwright (1977) : T. W. Cartwright
 John Chandless (1927) : J. Chandless
 Dan Cherry (1998–2007) : D. D. Cherry
 Frank Clarke (1956–1960) : F. Clarke
 Johnnie Clay (1921–1949) : J. C. Clay
 Phil Clift (1937–1955) : P. B. Clift
 Stephen Cook (2018) : S. C. Cook
 Chris Cooke (2011–2021) : C. B. Cooke
 Joe Cooke (2020–2021) : J. M. Cooke
 Edgar Cooper (1921) : E. Cooper
 Jack Cope (1935) : J. J. Cope
 George Cording (1921–1923) : G. E. Cording
 Tony Cordle (1963–1982) : E. A. Cordle
 Mark Cosgrove (2006–2011) : M. J. Cosgrove
 Dean Cosker (1996–2015) : D. A. Cosker
 Tony Cottey (1986–1998) : P. A. Cottey
 Chris Cowdrey (1992) : C. S. Cowdrey
 Nigel Cowley (1990) : N. G. C. Cowley
 Arthur Creber (1929) : A. B. Creber
 Harry Creber (1898–1922) : H. Creber
 Robert Croft (1989–2012) : R. D. B. Croft
 Peter Crowther (1977–1978) : P. G. Crowther
 Tom Cullen (2017–2021) : T. N. Cullen

D
 Adrian Dale (1989–2004) : A. Dale
 Jamie Dalrymple (2008–2010) : J. W. M. Dalrymple
 Alastair Dalton (1994–1996) : A. J. Dalton
 Guy Daly (1938) : G. N. Daly
 Simon Daniels (1981–1982) : S. A. B. Daniels
 Gilbert Dauncey (1957) : J. G. Dauncey
 Rodney David (1925–1929) : R. F. A. David
 Andrew Davies (1995–2007) : A. P. Davies
 Aubrey Davies (1934–1938) : D. A. Davies
 Dai Davies (1923–1939) : D. Davies
 Emrys Davies (1924–1954) : D. E. Davies
 Roy Davies (1950) : D. R. Davies
 Gwynfor Davies (1932) : G. Davies
 Gwyn Davies (1947–1948) : G. L. Davies
 Hugh Davies (1955–1960) : H. D. Davies
 Haydn Davies (1935–1958) : H. G. Davies
 John Davies (1952) : J. A. Davies
 Mark Davies (1990) : M. Davies
 Kim Davies (1975–1976) : M. K. Davies
 Mark Davies (1982) : M. N. Davies
 Clive Davies (1971–1972) : T. C. Davies
 Terry Davies (1979–1986) : T. Davies
 Bill Davies (1932–1935) : W. D. E. Davies
 Billy Davies (1954–1960) : W. G. Davies
 Bill Davies (1922–1927) : W. H. Davies
 Bryan Davis (1968–1970) : B. A. Davis
 John Davis (1959–1970) : F. J. Davis
 Roger Davis (1964–1976) : R. C. Davis
 Winston Davis (1982–1984) : W. W. Davis
 Ismail Dawood (1998–1999) : I. Dawood
 Marchant de Lange (2017–2020) : M. de Lange
 Simon Dennis (1989–1991) : S. J. Dennis
 John Derrick (1983–1991) : J. Derrick
 Louis Devereux (1956–1960) : L. N. Devereux
 Harold Dickinson (1934–1935) : H. J. Dickinson
 Mark Dobson (1992) : M. C. Dobson
 Aneurin Donald (2014–2018) : A. H. T. Donald
 Daniel Douthwaite (2019–2021) : D. A. Douthwaite
 Dick Duckfield (1930–1938) : R. G. Duckfield
 Bob Dudley-Jones (1972–1974) : R. D. L. Dudley–Jones
 Tony Duncan (1934) : A. A. Duncan
 Arnold Dyson (1926–1948) : A. H. Dyson

E
 Jim Eaglestone (1948–1949) : J. T. Eaglestone
 Brian Edrich (1954–1956) : B. R. Edrich
 Aubrey Edwards (1947) : A. M. E. Edwards
 Gareth Edwards (1997) : G. J. M. Edwards
 Matthew Elliott (2000–2007) : M. T. G. Elliott
 Geoff Ellis (1970–1976) : G. P. Ellis
 Bill Emery (1922) : W. Emery
 Alun Evans (1996–2002) : A. W. Evans
 David Evans (1956–1969) : D. G. L. Evans
 Gwynn Evans (1939) : G. Evans
 Herbie Evans (1922) : H. P. Evans
 Brian Evans (1958–1963) : J. B. Evans
 Talfryn Evans (1934) : T. Evans
 Trevor Every (1929–1934) : T. Every

F
 Fakhar Zaman (2019) : Fakhar Zaman
 Norman Featherstone (1980–1981) : N. G. Featherstone
 Daren Foster (1991–1992) : D. J. Foster
 Arthur Francis (1973–1984) : D. A. Francis
 Kenny Francis (1973) : K. M. V. Francis
 James Franklin (2006) : J. E. C. Franklin
 Roy Fredericks (1971–1973) : R. C. Fredericks
 Albert Freethy (1921) : A. E. Freethy
 Mark Frost (1990–1993) : M. Frost

G
 Royston Gabe-Jones (1922) : A. R. Gabe–Jones
 Sourav Ganguly (2005) : S. C. Ganguly
 Peter Gatehouse (1957–1962) : P. W. Gatehouse
 Fred Geary (1923) : F. W. Geary
 William Gemmill (1921–1926) : W. N. Gemmill
 Herschelle Gibbs (2008–2009) : H. H. Gibbs
 Ottis Gibson (1994–1996) : O. D. Gibson
 Jason Gillespie (2008) : J. N. Gillespie
 Ted Glover (1932–1938) : E. R. K. Glover
 John Glover (2011–2014) : J. C. Glover
 Dennis Good (1947) : D. C. Good
 Murray Goodwin (2013–2014) : M. W. Goodwin
 Andy Gorvin (2021) : A. W. Gorvin
 Richard Grant (2004–2008) : R. N. Grant
 Russell Green (1984) : R. C. Green
 Hugh Griffiths, Baron Griffiths (1946–1948) : W. H. Griffiths
 David Gwynne (1922–1923) : D. G. P. Gwynne

H
 Stamford Hacker (1921–1923) : W. S. Hacker
 Robert Hadley (1971) : R. J. Hadley
 Bob Haines (1933–1934) : C. V. G. Haines
 Alwyn Harris (1960–1964) : A. Harris
 George Harris (1932) : G. J. Harris
 James Harris (2006–2021) : J. A. R. Harris
 Leslie Harris (1947) : L. J. Harris
 Ernie Harris (1938–1947) : W. E. Harris
 Adam Harrison (2002–2007) : A. J. Harrison
 David Harrison (1999–2010) : D. S. Harrison
 George Harrison (1924–1925) : G. B. Harrison
 Stuart Harrison (1971–1977) : S. C. Harrison
 Bernard Hedges (1950–1967) : B. Hedges
 Tom Helm (2014) : T. G. Helm
 David Hemp (1991–2008) : D. L. Hemp
 Charlie Hemphrey (2019–2020) : C. R. Hemphrey
 Steve Henderson (1983–1985) : S. P. Henderson
 Moisés Henriques (2012) : M. C. Henriques
 Norman Hever (1948–1954) : N. G. Hever
 Denis Hickey (1986) : D. J. Hickey
 Len Hill (1964–1976) : L. W. Hill
 Mervyn Hill (1923) : M. L. Hill
 Rupert Hill (1975) : R. K. Hill
 Joe Hills (1926–1931) : J. J. Hills
 John Hinwood (1923) : J. W. J. Hinwood
 Robin Hobbs (1979–1981) : R. N. S. Hobbs
 Bert Hodges (1936) : A. E. Hodges
 Michael Hogan (2013–2021) : M. G. Hogan
 Geoff Holmes (1978–1991) : G. C. Holmes
 John Hopkins (1970–1988) : J. A. Hopkins
 Dick Horsfall (1956) : R. Horsfall
 Alan Howard (1928–1933) : A. R. Howard
 Wilf Hughes (1934–1938) : D. W. Hughes
 Gwyn Hughes (1962–1964) : G. Hughes
 Jonathan Hughes (2001–2005) : J. Hughes

I
 Colin Ingram (2015–2021) : C. A. Ingram

J
 Norman Jacob (1922) : N. E. Jacob
 David James (1948) : D. H. James
 Edward James (1922) : E. H. James
 Evan James (1946–1947) : E. L. James
 Nick James (2009–2013) : N. A. James
 Steve James (1985–2003) : S. P. James
 Hal Jarrett (1938) : H. H. Jarrett
 Keith Jarrett (1967) : K. S. Jarrett
 Javed Miandad (1980–1985) : Javed Miandad
 Huw Jenkins (1970) : H. Jenkins
 Vivian Jenkins (1931–1937) : V. G. J. Jenkins
 Leslie Jenkins (1921) : W. L. T. Jenkins
 Jack Johns (1922) : J. Johns
 Alan Jones (1957–1983) : A. Jones
 Allan Jones (1980–1981) : A. A. Jones
 Alex Jones (2010–2013) : A. J. Jones
 Alan Lewis Jones (1973–1986) : A. L. Jones
 David Jones (1938) : D. A. Jones
 Closs Jones (1934–1946) : E. C. Jones
 Edward Jones (1926) : E. C. Jones
 Eifion Jones (1960–1983) : E. W. Jones
 Harry Jones (1946) : H. O. Jones
 Jeff Jones (1960–1968) : I. J. Jones
 James Jones (1928–1929) : J. M. Jones
 Simon Jones (1998–2013) : S. P. Jones
 Tom Jones (1925–1928) : T. C. Jones
 Wilf Jones (1929–1933) : W. E. Jones
 William Jones (1933–1938) : W. M. Jones
 Wat Jones (1946–1947) : W. E. Jones
 Willie Jones (1937–1958) : W. E. Jones
 Arthur Joseph (1946) : A. F. Joseph
 Peter Judge (1939–1947) : P. F. Judge

K
 Jacques Kallis (1999) : J. H. Kallis
 Michael Kasprowicz (2002–2004) : M. S. Kasprowicz
 Neil Kendrick (1994/95–1996) : N. M. Kendrick
 James Kettleborough (2015–2016) : J. M. Kettleborough
 Usman Khawaja (2018) : U. T. Khawaja
 Collis King (1977) : C. L. King
 Graham Kingston (1967–1971) : G. C. Kingston
 Sam Kirnon (1991–1992) : S. Kirnon
 Garnett Kruger (2009) : G. J. P. Kruger

L
 Marnus Labuschagne (2019–21) : M. Labuschagne
 Tom Lancefield (2014) : T. J. Lancefield
 George Lavis (1928–1949) : G. Lavis
 Wayne Law (1997–2000) : W. L. Law
 Jeremy Lawlor (2015–2019) : J. L. Lawlor
 Peter Lawlor (1981) : P. J. Lawlor
 Roland Lefebvre (1993–1995) : R. P. Lefebvre
 Tony Lewis (1955–1974) : A. R. Lewis
 Brian Lewis (1965–1969) : B. Lewis
 David Lewis (1960–1969) : D. W. Lewis
 Euros Lewis (1961–1966) : E. J. Lewis
 Ken Lewis (1950–1956) : K. H. Lewis
 Mick Lewis (2004) : M. L. Lewis
 Anthony Ling (1934–1936) : A. J. P. Ling
 Jeff Linton (1932) : J. E. F. Linton
 Mike Llewellyn (1970–1982) : M. J. Llewellyn
 Barry Lloyd (1972–1984) : B. J. Lloyd
 David Lloyd (2012–2021) : D. L. Lloyd
 Kevin Lyons (1967–1977) : K. J. Lyons

M
 Andy Mack (1978–1980) : A. J. Mack
 John Madden-Gaskell (1922) : J. C. P. Madden
 Jimmy Maher (2001–2007) : J. P. Maher
 Majid Khan (1968–1976) : Majid Khan
 Steve Malone (1985) : S. J. Malone
 Shaun Marsh (2012–2019) : S. E. Marsh
 William Marsh (1947) : W. E. Marsh
 George Martin (1921) : E. G. Martin
 Fred Mathias (1922–1930) : F. W. Mathias
 Austin Matthews (1937–1947) : A. D. G. Matthews
 Matthew Maynard (1985–2005) : M. P. Maynard
 Tom Maynard (2007–2010) : T. L. Maynard
 Jim McConnon (1950–1961) : J. E. McConnon
 Brendon McCullum (2006) : B. B. McCullum
 Nathan McCullum (2013) : N. L. McCullum
 Les McFarlane (1985) : L. L. McFarlane
 Jamie McIlroy (2021) : J. P. McIlroy
 Frank Meggitt (1923) : F. C. Meggitt
 Jack Mercer (1922–1939) : J. Mercer
 Craig Meschede (2015–2019) : C. A. J. Meschede
 Colin Metson (1987–1997) : C. P. Metson
 Hamish Miller (1963–1966) : H. D. S. Miller
 Steve Monkhouse (1987–1988) : S. Monkhouse
 Stan Montgomery (1949–1953) : S. W. Montgomery
 Niel Morgan (1928–1929) : A. N. Morgan
 Owen Morgan (2016–2020) : A. O. Morgan
 Noel Morgan (1934) : E. N. Morgan
 Howard Morgan (1958) : H. W. Morgan
 Trevil Morgan (1925–1934) : J. T. Morgan
 Tom Morgan (1921–1925) : T. R. Morgan
 Guy Morgan (1925–1938) : W. G. Morgan
 Percy Morgan (1925) : W. P. Morgan
 Hugh Morris (1981–1997) : H. Morris
 Ian Morris (1966–1968) : I. Morris
 Vernon Morris (1921–1929) : V. L. Morris
 Percy Morris (1921–1925) : W. P. Morris
 Ezra Moseley (1980–1986) : E. A. Moseley
 Ernie Moss (1923) : S. E. Moss
 Len Muncer (1947–1954) : B. L. Muncer
 Jack Murphy (2017–2018) : J. R. Murphy

N
 Jack Nash (1921–1922) : A. Nash
 Malcolm Nash (1966–1983) : M. A. Nash
 Ricky Needham (1975) : P. J. E. Needham
 Michael Neser (2021) : M. G. Neser
 Keith Newell (1999–2002) : K. Newell
 Aneurin Norman (2011–2012) : A. J. Norman
 Marcus North (2012–2013) : M. J. North
 Phil North (1985–1989) : P. D. North

O
 Arthur O'Bree (1921–1923) : A. O'Bree
 Rodney Ontong (1975–1989) : R. C. Ontong
 Mike O'Shea (2005–2012) : M. P. O'Shea
 Will Owen (2007–2014) : W. T. Owen

P
 Richard Parkhouse (1939) : R. J. Parkhouse
 Gilbert Parkhouse (1948–1964) : W. G. A. Parkhouse
 Owen Parkin (1994–2003) : O. T. Parkin
 Parvez Mir (1979) : Parvez Mir
 Samit Patel (2019) : S. R. Patel
 Duncan Pauline (1986) : D. B. Pauline
 Sam Pearce (2021) : S. J. Pearce
 Cecil Pearson (1922) : C. J. H. Pearson
 Nicky Peng (2006–2007) : N. Peng
 Dewi Penrhyn Jones (2015) : D. Penrhyn Jones
 Bertie Perkins (1925–1933) : A. L. B. Perkins
 Neil Perry (1979–1981) : N. J. Perry
 Alviro Petersen (2011) : A. N. Petersen
 Stuart Phelps (1993–1994) : B. S. Phelps
 Frank Pinch (1921–1926) : F. B. Pinch
 Len Pitchford (1935) : L. Pitchford
 Jim Pleass (1947–1956) : J. E. Pleass
 Harry Podmore (2016–2017) : H. W. Podmore
 Robert Pook (1990) : N. R. Pook
 Arthur Porter (1936–1949) : A. Porter
 Mike Powell (1997–2011) : M. J. Powell
 Tyrone Powell (1976) : T. L. Powell
 Trevor Preece (1923) : T. Preece
 Jim Pressdee (1949–1965) : J. S. Pressdee
 Mark Price (1984–1985) : M. R. Price

R
 David Reason (1921–1922) : D. J. Reason
 Tom Reason (1923) : T. F. Reason
 George Reed (1934–1938) : G. H. Reed
 Michael Reed (2012–2013) : M. T. Reed
 Alan Rees (1955–1971) : A. H. M. Rees
 Gareth Rees (2006–2014) : G. P. Rees
 Steven Reingold (2021) : S. J. Reingold
 Graham Reynolds (1969–1971) : G. E. A. Reynolds
 Hubert Rhys (1929–1930) : H. R. J. Rhys
 Gwyn Richards (1971–1979) : G. Richards
 Viv Richards (1990–1993) : I. V. A. Richards
 John Riches (1947) : J. D. H. Riches
 Norman Riches (1921–1934) : N. V. H. Riches
 Jack Rippon (1947–1948) : T. J. Rippon
 John Roberts (1934–1936) : J. F. Roberts
 Martin Roberts (1985–1991) : M. L. Roberts
 Maurice Robinson (1946–1950) : M. Robinson
 Paul Roebuck (1988) : P. G. P. Roebuck
 Basil Rogers (1923) : B. L. Rogers
 Billy Root (2019–2021) : W. T. Root
 Andrew Roseberry (1994–1995) : A. Roseberry
 Charles Rowe (1982–1984) : C. J. C. Rowe
 Jacques Rudolph (2014–2017) : J. A. Rudolph
 Hamish Rutherford (2021) : H. D. Rutherford
 Frank Ryan (1922–1931) : F. P. Ryan

S
 Andrew Salter (2012–2021) : A. G. Salter
 Glyn Samuel (1936) : G. N. T. W. Samuel
 Nick Selman (2016–2021) : N. J. Selman
 Mike Selvey (1983–1984) : M. W. W. Selvey
 Adam Shantry (2008–2011) : A. J. Shantry
 James Sharples (1922) : J. E. Sharples
 Ravi Shastri (1987–1991) : R. J. Shastri
 Adrian Shaw (1992–2003) : A. D. Shaw
 George Shaw (1951–1955) : G. B. Shaw
 Alf Shea (1928) : A. J. Shea
 Dennis Shea (1947–1948) : W. D. Shea
 Don Shepherd (1950–1972) : D. J. Shepherd
 Samuel Silkin, Baron Silkin of Dulwich (1938) : S. C. Silkin
 Prem Sisodiya (2018–2021) : P. Sisodiya
 Billy Slade (1961–1967) : W. D. Slade
 Cyril Smart (1927–1946) : C. C. Smart
 Chris Smith (1979) : C. L. Smith
 Ian Smith (1985–1991) : I. Smith
 Ruaidhri Smith (2013–2021) : R. A. J. Smith
 John Solanky (1972–1976) : J. W. Solanky
 Kamal Somaia (1989) : K. A. Somaia
 Charles Spencer (1925) : C. R. Spencer
 Helm Spencer (1923–1925) : H. Spencer
 Cecil Spiller (1922) : C. W. Spiller
 Billy Spiller (1921–1923) : W. Spiller
 John Steele (1984–1986) : J. F. Steele
 Theo Stewart (1923) : T. L. Stewart
 Jimmy Stone (1922–1923) : J. Stone
 Dennis Sullivan (1922–1928) : D. Sullivan
 Peter Swart (1978–1979) : P. D. Swart
 Edward Sweet-Escott (1921) : E. R. Sweet–Escott
 Harry Symonds (1921–1925) : H. G. Symonds

T
 Jock Tait (1921–1926) : J. R. Tait
 Shaun Tait (2010) : S. W. Tait
 Cyril Tamplin (1947) : C. Tamplin
 Bert Tayler (1921–1927) : H. W. Tayler
 Callum Taylor (2019–2021) : C. Z. Taylor
 Tom Taylor (1932–1934) : H. T. Taylor
 Arthur Thomas (1925) : A. E. Thomas
 Darren Thomas (1992–2006) : S. D. Thomas
 David Thomas (1932) : D. J. Thomas
 Dillwyn Thomas (1939) : D. Thomas
 Ian Thomas (1998–2005) : I. J. Thomas
 Greg Thomas (1979–1988) : J. G. Thomas
 Gwyn Thomas (1922) : J. L. G. Thomas
 Richie Thomas (1969–1974) : R. J. Thomas
 Paul Todd (1987–1988) : P. A. Todd
 Harry Tomlinson (1921–1923) : H. Tomlinson
 Steve Tomlinson (1998) : S. C. B. Tomlinson
 Stan Trick (1946–1950) : W. M. S. Trick
 Kyle Tudge (2006) : K. D. Tudge
 Maurice Turnbull (1924–1939) : M. J. L. Turnbull
 Cec Tyson (1926) : C. T. Tyson

V
 Timm van der Gugten (2016–2021) : T. van der Gugten
 Martin van Jaarsveld (2012) : M. van Jaarsveld
 Corrie van Zyl (1987–1988) : C. J. P. G. van Zyl
 Hugh Vaughan-Thomas (1933) : H. W. Vaughan–Thomas

W
 Graham Wagg (2011–2020) : G. G. Wagg
 Peter Walker (1956–1972) : P. M. Walker
 Roman Walker (2019–2021) : R. I. Walker
 Mark Wallace (1999–2016) : M. A. Wallace
 Cyril Walters (1923–1928) : C. F. Walters
 Stewart Walters (2011–2014) : S. J. Walters
 Waqar Younis (1997–1998) : Waqar Younis
 Don Ward (1954–1962) : D. J. Ward
 Claude Warner (1923) : C. C. Warner
 Paul Warren (1997) : P. M. Warren
 Huw Waters (2005–2013) : H. T. Waters
 Steve Watkin (1986–2001) : S. L. Watkin
 Allan Watkins (1939–1961) : A. J. Watkins
 Ryan Watkins (2003–2009) : R. E. Watkins
 Bill Watkins (1950) : W. M. Watkins
 James Weighell (2021) : W. J. Weighell
 Gwilym Went (1934) : G. J. H. Went
 Alex Wharf (2000–2009) : A. G. Wharf
 Ossie Wheatley (1961–1969/70) : O. S. Wheatley
 Butch White (1972) : D. W. White
 Willie Whitehill (1960) : W. K. Whitehill
 Eric Whitman (1932) : E. I. E. Whitman
 Tom Whittington (1921–1923) : T. A. L. Whittington
 Alan Wilkins (1975–1983) : A. H. Wilkins
 Dyson Williams (1921) : D. B. Williams
 Lawrence Williams (1969–1977) : D. L. Williams
 Ieuan Williams (1931) : I. Williams
 James Williams (1993) : J. R. A. Williams
 Tip Williams (1928–1930) : L. E. W. Williams
 Matthew Wood (2008) : M. J. Wood
 Wilf Wooller (1938–1962) : W. Wooller
 Francis Worsley (1922–1923) : F. F. Worsley
 Ben Wright (2006–2015) : B. J. Wright
 Damien Wright (2007) : D. G. Wright

Y
 Younis Ahmed (1984–1986) : Younis Ahmed

List A only cricketers
The following Glamorgan players did not appear in first-class cricket but did play for the county team in List A cricket:
 Andrew Jones (1993) : Andrew J. Jones
 Kim Norkett (1974) : K. T. Norkett

See also
 List of Glamorgan cricket captains

References

Glamorgan
Glamorgan County Cricket Club
Cricket
Cricket, Glamorgan